Hans Tropper (1905–1978) was an Austrian Professor of Electrical Engineering with research interest in breakdown strength of liquid insulation. The ‘Hans Tropper Memorial Lecture’ is held in his honour to open each IEEE International Conference on Dielectric Liquids. He also briefly worked for Elin Aktiengesellschaft fur Elektrische Industrie.

Early life 
Hans Tropper was born in 1905, in Vienna, Austria. He was an only child born to parents Johann and Josefa. As well as having no siblings, he also had no aunts or uncles. Tropper was brought up by his mother for most of his teenage years after his father was killed during WWI while serving as an officer in the Austrian Army.

Personal life 
Tropper married Mary, also a doctor (in mathematics), in 1947, becoming a British citizen in the same year. They had two daughters together.

Academic career 
Tropper received his PhD in 1939. In 1956, Hans Tropper was appointed as a senior lecturer at Queen Mary College London, reading electrical engineering. His personal research interest was in the dielectric breakdown strength of insulating liquids. In 1969 he was made professor of electrical engineering at the same college. During this time, he oversaw 56 doctorate theses and 7 masters’ dissertation students as either supervisor or advisor, including students at Queen Mary College London as well as many international candidates. Notable students include Brendan Scaife.

Tropper was responsible for the running of the high voltage at Queen Mary College, the first at a UK University.

Tropper published  Electric Circuit Theory - An Introduction to Steady State and Transient Theory Based on the Superposition Principle  in 1949.

Memorial lecture 
Hans Tropper contributed substantially to the field of dielectric materials. In recognition of this, a memorial lecture was held in the second International Conference on Dielectric Liquids (ICDL) after his death (the eighth sequential conference), at Pavia, Italy. The ICDL conference is an international conference that focuses on results and practical experience of properties, dielectric phenomena and applications of insulating liquids, bringing together an international audience to share knowledge around this field.

The paper associated to the memorial lecture is typically published as part of the conference proceedings. A full history of Hans Tropper Memorial Lectures is given below.	
			

∗Not published as part of conference proceedings, instead published in IEEE Transactions on Electrical Insulation Vol. EI-20 No.2, April 1985

References 

1905 births
1975 deaths
Austrian electrical engineers
Scientists from Vienna
Austrian emigrants to the United Kingdom
Naturalised citizens of the United Kingdom
Academics of Queen Mary University of London